Nadezhda Nikolayevna Gorshkova (born 27 June 1956), married surname: Shevalovskaya is a Russian former pair skater who competed for the Soviet Union. With her husband Evgeni Shevalovski, she is a two-time Prize of Moscow News champion (1974–75) and a three-time Soviet national silver medalist (1974–76). The duo finished in the top six at three ISU Championships.

Results
(with Shevalovski)

References

 skatabase

1956 births
Living people
Russian female pair skaters
Soviet female pair skaters
Figure skaters from Moscow